The parallel parking problem is a motion planning problem in control theory and mechanics to determine the path a car must take to parallel park into a parking space.  The front wheels of a car are permitted to turn, but the rear wheels must stay aligned.  When a car is initially adjacent to a parking space, to move into the space it would need to move in a direction perpendicular to the allowed path of motion of the rear wheels.  The admissible motions of the car in its configuration space are an example of a nonholonomic system.

See also
 Automatic parking
 Bicycle and motorcycle dynamics
 Falling cat problem
 Moving sofa problem

References
 .
 .

Control theory